Fulpmes is a market town and a municipality in Stubaital, Tyrol, Austria. In 2015 it had a population of 4,250, of whom 14.5% did not have Austrian nationality. Fulpmes is the center of iron production in the area, and lies at the base of the Schlick 2000 ski area.

Geography
The municipality of Fulpmes belongs to the Innsbruck Land district. The neighboring municipalities are Neustift to the west and Telfes and Mieders to the east. Fulpmes is the terminal station of the narrow-gauge railway Stubaitalbahn from Innsbruck.

Population

Landmarks
The Stubaier Bauerntheater, founded in 1903, is one of the oldest peasant theatres in the Tyrol.

Notable people
Clemens Holzmeister, (1886–1983) architect
Gregor Schlierenzauer, ski jumper

References

External links

Cities and towns in Innsbruck-Land District